Linton Township is one of eighteen townships in Allamakee County, Iowa, USA.  At the 2010 census, its population was 305.

History
Linton Township was organized in 1851.

Geography
According to the USGS, it contains two cemeteries: Cherry Mound and Sixteen.

References

External links
 US-Counties.com
 City-Data.com

Townships in Allamakee County, Iowa
Townships in Iowa
1851 establishments in Iowa
Populated places established in 1851